Sagittaria longiloba is a species of flowering plant in the water plantain family known by the common name longbarb arrowhead and Gregg arrowhead. It is native to the south-central and southwestern United States (Texas, New Mexico, Oklahoma, Kansas, Nebraska, Arizona and California) plus Mexico, Venezuela and Nicaragua. It is also reportedly naturalized in the western Himalayas of India and Bhutan. It grows in slow-moving, stagnant, and ephemeral water bodies such as ponds and small streams, and sometimes disturbed and cultivated habitat such as rice fields and irrigation ditches.

Sagittaria longiloba is a perennial aquatic plant growing from a spherical tuber. The leaves are sagittate, or shaped like arrowheads with two longer, narrower, pointed lobes opposite the shorter tip. The leaf blades are borne on very long petioles. The plant is monoecious, with individuals bearing both male and female flowers. The inflorescence which rises above the surface of the water is a raceme made up of several whorls of flowers, the lowest node bearing female flowers and upper nodes bearing male flowers. The flower is up to 3 centimeters wide with three white petals. The male flowers have rings of stamens at the centers. Female flowers each have a spherical cluster of pistils which develops into a head of tiny fruits.

References

External links
photo of herbarium specimen at Missouri Botanical Garden, collected in Nicaragua
UC Davis IPM Weed Gallery

longiloba
Flora of Mexico
Flora of Texas
Flora of New Mexico
Flora of Oklahoma
Flora of Nebraska
Flora of Arizona
Flora of California
Flora of Kansas
Flora of Nicaragua
Flora of Venezuela
Freshwater plants
Edible plants
Plants described in 1894
Flora without expected TNC conservation status